Howard Elliott Ashman (May 17, 1950 – March 14, 1991) was an American playwright, lyricist and stage director. He collaborated with composer Alan Menken on several works and is most widely known for his work on feature films for Walt Disney Animation Studios, for which Ashman wrote the lyrics and Menken composed the music. His work included songs for Little Shop of Horrors, The Little Mermaid, Beauty and the Beast, and Aladdin. Sir Tim Rice took over to write the rest of the songs for the latter film after Ashman's death in 1991.

Early life and education
Ashman was born in Baltimore, Maryland, the son of Shirley Thelma (née Glass) and Raymond Albert Ashman, an ice cream cone manufacturer. His family was Jewish. He started his theater experiences with the Children's Theater Association (CTA), playing roles such as Aladdin.  Ashman first studied at Boston University and Goddard College (with a stop at Tufts University's Summer Theater) and then went on to earn a masters degree in Fine Arts at Indiana Universityin 1974.

Career
After graduating from Indiana in 1974 he moved to New York and worked as an editor at Grosset & Dunlap. His first two plays, Cause Maggie's Afraid of the Dark and Dreamstuff, were met with mixed reviews. His play The Confirmation was produced in 1977 at Princeton's McCarter Theater and starred Herschel Bernardi. In 1977 he became the artistic director of the WPA Theater in New York. He met future collaborator Alan Menken at the BMI Workshop, where he was classmates with Maury Yeston and Ed Kleban, among others. He first worked with Menken on the 1979 musical Kurt Vonnegut's God Bless You, Mr. Rosewater, adapted from Vonnegut's novel of the same name. They also collaborated on Little Shop of Horrors with Ashman as director, lyricist, and librettist, winning the Drama Desk Award for Outstanding Lyrics and receiving a Grammy Award nomination. He also directed the workshop of Nine by Yeston at the Eugene O'Neill Theater Center, and after asking why Guido's wife stays with him after she knows he has not been faithful, inspired Yeston to write "My Husband Makes Movies".

Ashman was director, lyricist, and book writer for the 1986 Broadway musical Smile (music by Marvin Hamlisch). This musical was not well received and closed with only 48 performances. Also in 1986, Ashman wrote the screenplay for the Frank Oz–directed film adaptation of his musical Little Shop of Horrors, as well as contributing the lyrics for two new songs, "Some Fun Now" and "Mean Green Mother from Outer Space", the latter of which received an Academy Award nomination.

In 1986, Ashman was brought in to write lyrics for a song in Walt Disney Animation Studios' Oliver & Company. He then also worked with Tina Turner on a script which never came to fruition. While there he was offered several works which had been on the back burner and was told about another project that Disney had been working on for a couple years. The film was The Little Mermaid, Disney's first fairy tale in 30 years. Ashman, along with Menken, wrote all of the songs for the film. Ashman became a driving force during the early years of the "Disney Renaissance". He would hold story meetings, and said the animation and musical styles were made for each other, which is why Disney needed to continue making musical movies. He also made strong choices in casting actors with strong musical theater and acting backgrounds. The Little Mermaid was released in November 1989 and it was an enormous success. Ashman and Menken received two Golden Globe nominations and three Academy Award nominations, including two Best Original Song nominations for "Kiss the Girl" and "Under The Sea" with Ashman and Menken winning for the latter.

In 1988, while working on The Little Mermaid, Ashman pitched the idea of an animated musical adaptation of Aladdin to Disney. After he wrote a group of songs with partner Alan Menken and a film treatment, a screenplay was written by Linda Woolverton, who had worked on Beauty and the Beast. Directors John Musker and Ron Clements then joined the production, and the story underwent many changes, with some elements of the original treatment being dropped. Out of the 16 songs written for Aladdin, three of Ashman's songs ended up in the finished film, which was released after his death.

During early production of Aladdin, Ashman and Menken were approached to help reinvigorate and save the production of Beauty and the Beast, which was going nowhere as a non-musical. Ashman, wishing to focus on Aladdin and his health, reluctantly agreed. It was at this time that his health began to decline due to his illness. Regardless, he completed lyrical work on Beauty and the Beast before his death in March 1991. The film was released mere months after his death and is dedicated to him. In May 2020, Beauty and the Beast co-director Kirk Wise said, "If you had to point to one person responsible for the 'Disney Renaissance', I would say it was Howard."

Along with Menken, Ashman was the co-recipient of two Grammy Awards, two Golden Globe Awards and two Academy Awards.

Death
During production of The Little Mermaid in 1988, Ashman was diagnosed with HIV/AIDS, though he continued to write songs. Historian Peter C. Kunze noted that Ashman was supported by Jeffrey Katzenberg, with the company even creating a production unit near his home, so he could receive treatment in New York City to work on Beauty and the Beast. He survived to see an early private screening of the film. When taken to the Saint Vincent's Hospital in Manhattan, he weighed 80 pounds, had lost his sight, and barely spoke.

Ashman died on March 14, 1991, at the age of 40 years old, and never saw the completed film. Beauty and the Beast, released eight months after his death, was dedicated to his memory, featuring the message after the end credits: To our friend Howard, who gave a mermaid her voice, and a beast his soul. We will be forever grateful. Howard Ashman 1950-1991. He was buried in the Ohev Shalom Cemetery in Reistertown, Maryland, and survived by Sarah Gillespie and Shirley Gershman.

Personal life
Ashman met Stuart White, one of his first partners, at a summer university program in 1969. Originally close friends, the two formed a bond which led to a secret relationship. They both completed master's degrees at Indiana University and then moved to upstate New York. Ashman and White re-opened the Workshop of Players Art Foundation (WPA) together as artistic directors. The two fell out in 1980, but reunited briefly in 1983.

Ashman then met Bill Lauch in 1984 who worked as an architect. Lauch accepted Ashman's posthumous Oscar for Beauty and the Beast in 1992 after Ashman's death.

Awards and nominations
Over the course of his career, Ashman won two Academy Awards (one posthumous) out of seven nominations. Of these nominations, four are posthumous nominations, the most in Academy Awards history.  He also won a posthumous Laurence Olivier Award and five Grammy Awards (three of them posthumous), among other accolades.

Accolades

Special recognitions 

 1990 – Special Award for outstanding contribution to the success of the Academy of Television Arts and Sciences' anti-drug special for children, for the song "Wonderful Ways to Say No" from the TV special Cartoon All-Stars to the Rescue
 2001 – Disney Legend Award (POSTHUMOUS)

Tributes 
On the 2002 Special Edition DVD of Beauty and the Beast, the Disney animators teamed up again and added a new song called "Human Again", which Ashman and Menken had written for the film but had been cut from the finished product. On Disc 2, there is a short documentary entitled Howard Ashman: In Memoriam that features many people who worked on Beauty and the Beast who talk about Ashman's involvement on the film and how his death was truly a loss for them.

Jeffrey Katzenberg claims there are two angels watching down on them that put their magic touch on every film they made. Those two angels are Ashman and Walt Disney himself.

An album of Ashman singing his own work entitled Howard Sings Ashman was released on November 11, 2008, by PS Classics as part of the Library of Congress "Songwriter Series."

The 2009 documentary, Waking Sleeping Beauty, which centers around Disney's animation renaissance, is dedicated to him, as well as Frank Wells, Joe Ranft, and Roy E. Disney.

In March 2017, Don Hahn confirmed he was working on a documentary biographical film about Howard Ashman. The documentary film titled Howard premiered at the Tribeca Film Festival on April 22, 2018, before having a limited theatrical run on December 18, 2018. It was released on Disney+ on August 7, 2020.

Credits 
 The Confirmation (1977) (writer)
 God Bless You, Mr. Rosewater (1979) (lyricist, librettist and director)
 Little Shop of Horrors (1982) (lyricist, librettist and director)
 Smile (1986) (lyricist, librettist and director)
 Little Shop of Horrors (1986) (lyricist and screenwriter)
 Oliver & Company (1988) (lyricist for "Once Upon a Time in New York City")
 The Little Mermaid (1989) (lyricist, producer, additional dialogue)
 Cartoon All-Stars to the Rescue (1990) (lyricist for "Wonderful Way to Say No")
 Beauty and the Beast (1991) (lyricist, executive producer) (dedicated)
 Aladdin (1992) (lyricist for "Arabian Nights", "Friend Like Me", and "Prince Ali").

References

External links
 Official website
 Profile @ vimeo.com
 Disney Legends
 
 
Howard Ashman papers, 1973-2010 at the Library of Congress

1950 births
1991 deaths
20th-century American dramatists and playwrights
20th-century American male writers
20th-century American male musicians
AIDS-related deaths in New York (state)
American expatriates in Burkina Faso
American male dramatists and playwrights
American musical theatre librettists
American musical theatre lyricists
American theatre directors
Animation composers
Best Original Song Academy Award-winning songwriters
Boston University alumni
Broadway composers and lyricists
Broadway theatre directors
American gay musicians
American gay writers
American LGBT songwriters
American LGBT dramatists and playwrights
Golden Globe Award-winning musicians
Grammy Award winners
Indiana University Bloomington alumni
Jewish American songwriters
Gay dramatists and playwrights
LGBT theatre directors
LGBT people from Maryland
Gay Jews
Gay songwriters
Musicians from Baltimore
Peace Corps volunteers
Songwriters from Maryland
Walt Disney Animation Studios people
Writers from Baltimore
20th-century American LGBT people